Qaleh Kandi may refer to:
 Qaleh Kandi, Ahar
 Qaleh Kandi, Kaleybar